Okogyeabour Nkuah Okomdom II (born Samuel Appiah Gyenin; 1951–2011) was a traditional ruler and Paramount Chief of the Sefwi Wiawso Traditional Area in the Western Region of Ghana from 1997 to 2011.

References 

Ghanaian royalty
People from Western Region (Ghana)
1951 births
2011 deaths